The 2019–20 Carolina Hurricanes season was the 41st season for the National Hockey League (NHL) franchise that was established on June 22, 1979 (following seven seasons of play in the World Hockey Association), and 22nd season since the franchise relocated from Hartford to start the 1997–98 NHL season.

The season was suspended by the league officials on March 12, 2020, after several other professional and collegiate sports organizations followed suit as a result of the ongoing COVID-19 pandemic. On May 26, the NHL regular season was officially declared over with the remaining games being cancelled. The Hurricanes advanced to the playoffs where they defeated the New York Rangers in a three-game sweep in the Qualifying Round, but were defeated in the First Round by the Boston Bruins in five games.

Standings

Divisional standings

Eastern Conference

Schedule and results

Preseason
The preseason schedule was published on June 12, 2019.

Regular season
The regular season schedule was published on June 25, 2019.

Playoffs

The Hurricanes faced the New York Rangers in the qualifying round, and defeated them in three games.

The Hurricanes faced the Boston Bruins in the first round, where they were defeated in five games.

Player statistics

Skaters

Goaltenders

†Denotes player spent time with another team before joining the Hurricanes. Stats reflect time with the Hurricanes only.
‡Denotes player was traded mid-season. Stats reflect time with the Hurricanes only.
Bold/italics denotes franchise record.

References

Carolina Hurricanes seasons
Carolina Hurricanes
Carolina Hurricanes
Carolina Hurricanes